Synthesis anarchism, also known as united anarchism, is an organisational principle that seeks unity in diversity, aiming to bring together anarchists of different tendencies into a single federation. Developed mainly by the Russian anarchist Volin and the French anarchist Sébastien Faure, synthesis anarchism was designed to appeal to communists, syndicalists and individualists alike. According to synthesis anarchism, an anarchist federation ought to be heterogeneous and relatively loosely-organised, in order to preserve the individual autonomy of its members.

History 

Since the 1890s, there had been a drive within the anarchist movement to foster cooperation between the various anarchist schools of thought and to unite them across ideological lines. During the dispute between the collectivists and communists, the Italian anarchist Errico Malatesta and the Spanish anarchist Fernando Tarrida del Mármol advocated for anarchists of both tendencies to unite, according to the principle of "anarchism without adjectives".

Over the subsequent decades, Max Nettlau developed this principle into a call for anarchists to unite into a single organisation, which would preserve individual autonomy and encourage mutual aid between its members. The principle of individual autonomy was particularly central to the organisational ideas of Sébastien Faure and Emma Goldman, as well as to the Japanese "pure anarchists" that advocated for a more loosely-organised grouping. The Russian anarchist Volin considered all anarchist schools of thought to be valid, advocating for a pluralistic organisation that unites anarchists of different tendencies behind a set of common principles and goals. While Goldman considered the best path to be a loose framework that extended autonomy to each tendency, Volin and Faure would go on to develop a "synthesis" of the different tendencies, with the aim of creating an organisational platform that would be acceptable to the entire anarchist movement.

Revolution in Ukraine 
Following the October Revolution, many Russian anarchists attempted to escape the Red Terror by fleeing to Ukraine. They established their headquarters in Kharkiv, which became the center for their campaign to unify the disorganised anarchist movement into a coordinated revolutionary organisation, which they hoped would be able to combat the rise of Bolshevism. This campaign resulted in the establishment of the Nabat Confederation of Anarchist Organizations, which quickly spread throughout all of Ukraine's major cities.

The statutes of the Nabat were drawn up by Volin, who established it according to the principles of "united anarchism". The organization was designed to extend a great deal of autonomy to its membership and be open to members from all of the major anarchist schools of thought: anarcho-communism, anarcho-syndicalism and individualist anarchism. This "united anarchism" was immediately criticised by Volin's former anarcho-syndicalist comrades, who regarded it as an ineffective way to unify the anarchist movement and feared the dominance of anarcho-communists in such an organization.

Despite its establishment according to the principles of "united anarchism", as the Ukrainian Revolution progressed, the Nabat developed into a more tightly-organised federation with its own unitary policy. The Nabat's secretariat acted as the organisation's executive, directing the organisation's membership and overseeing its resources. It quickly threw its support behind the Makhnovist movement and the Revolutionary Insurgent Army of Ukraine, which it hoped would spearhead the organisation of the Ukrainian anarchist movement.

Synthesism versus platformism
After the Russian and Ukrainian anarchist movements were forced into exile, they experienced a split over organisational principles. Inspired the model of the Nabat, Volin had proposed the organisation of an anarchist federation, which would account for discipline and collective responsibility by means of "natural, free and technical centralisation", while also accounting for a diversity of anarchist tendencies within the organisation. But members of Delo Truda quickly rejected Volin's "synthesis" as incoherent and out of step with anarchist theory. Within the Soviet Union itself, former members of the Nabat had also since gravitated away from Volin's organisational principles.

In June 1926, Peter Arshinov, Nestor Makhno and Ida Mett collaborated on the drafting of The Organisational Platform, which called for the establishment of a specific anarchist organisation according to the principles of ideological and tactical unity, in order to combat chronic disorganisation within the anarchist movement. In April 1927, Volin penned a reply to the Platform, which was co-signed by other exiled anarchists such as Senya Fleshin and Mollie Steimer. The Reply criticised the Platform as running counter to anarchist ideology, accusing the platformists of desiring to establish a centralised anarchist political party and eventually a state, which Volin directly compared to Bolshevism. Volin, Fleshin and Steimer went on to accuse the Delo Truda group of anti-intellectualism and even antisemitism.

In the autumn of 1927, at a congress of the French Anarchist Union, the platformist majority within the organisation overruled the synthesist minority. The French Synthesists, led by Sébastien Faure, split from the Union and established their own Federal Association of Anarchists (AFA). Faure himself desired to create a powerful organisation that could unite disparate revolutionary groupings and be capable of leading an insurrection. Although Faure had rejected the Platform as sectarian and ideologically homogeneous, preferring instead to cultivate good faith and mutual aid between anarchists, he set his own conception of synthesis apart from Volin's "dilettantism". In 1928, Sebastien Faure published The Anarchist Synthesis, arguing for looser organisational principles that allowed ideological diversity.

Formation of synthesis federations
In 1927, the Iberian Anarchist Federation (FAI) was established along synthesist lines, in order to act as a counterweight to the reformism expressed within the Confederación Nacional del Trabajo (CNT). In the wake of the FAI, synthesis federations were also formed in other countries, including the Francophone Anarchist Federation (FAF) in 1937 and the Italian Anarchist Federation (FAIt) in 1945. Following the defeat of imperial Japan, the Korean anarchist movement reorganised into the Federation of Free Society Builders (FFSB), which was formed along synthesist lines and continued to function in the South Korea until the October Restoration, when martial law was declared in the Republic of Korea.

In 1968, the International of Anarchist Federations (IAF) was established at a congress in Italy, building on the previously established international network at the initiative of the FAF. Established along synthesist lines, the IAF brought together anarchist federations from Argentina, Australia, Britain, Bulgaria, Cuba, France, Germany, Greece, Iberia, Italy, Japan, the Netherlands, Norway and Switzerland. The IAF affirmed its commitment to the principles of libertarian communism at its second congress in 1971, but soon lost its Cuban section due to its soft line on the Castro government. Nevertheless, the IAF managed to develop further links in Hong Kong and Vietnam and made contact with other anarchist federations in Europe and South America.

References

Bibliography

Further reading

External links 
 "Synthesis Anarchism / Anarchism Without Adjectives" (an archive with texts related to synthesis anarchism as well as anarchism without adjectives).
 
 "Especifismo and Synthesis/ Synthesism" by Felipe Corrêa
 J.3.4 Why do many anarchists oppose the "Platform"? on An Anarchist FAQ

 
Anarchist theory
Anarchist schools of thought